The following is a list of religious affiliations of vice presidents of the United States.

By term

Affiliation totals

See also 
Religious affiliations of presidents of the United States
List of vice presidents of the United States by home state
Religious affiliation in the United States Senate

Footnotes

References 
 Adherents.com Religious Affiliation of U.S. Vice Presidents Retrieved February 1, 2009

United States vice president 
Religious affiliations
Vice Presidential religious affiliations
Vice President